Gonda is a city and municipal board of Gonda district in the Indian state of Uttar Pradesh. It is situated 120 km north east of the state capital Lucknow. Gonda is divided into four tehsils named Gonda, Colonelganj, Tarabganj and Mankapur.

History
The area of present-day Gonda District of Uttar Pradesh is mentioned in the Mahabharata as Anga or Angdesh'. Duryodhana had declared Karna the king of this country.  According to the beliefs, Jarasandha had presented the organ country to Duryodhana as a gift. This place is also known as Shaktipeeth.
The name of this district comes from the Sanskrit-Hindi word 'Gonarda', meaning cow's voice. The cowsheds of the royal lineage of Ayodhya viz. Ikshvaku (Raghukul) of the Solar dynasty were located here. The territory covered by the present district of Gonda is a part of the ancient Anga. After the departure  to Saket Dham of Lord Rama, the celebrated sovereign of the Solar line who ruled Kosala, the kingdom was divided into two portions defined by the Ghaghara river. The northern portion was then ruled by his son, Lava, with the city of Shravasti as his capital.

More recently, ancient Buddhist remains dating to the early days of Buddhism have been found throughout the region, including Sravasti.

Demographics
As per provisional data of 2011 census, Gonda urban agglomeration had a population of 138,929, out of which males were 71,475 and females were 67,454. The population in the age range of 0 to 6 years was 15,608. The total number of literates were 99,057 (71.3%), of which 55,067 were males and 43,990 were females. The sex ratio was 944. The effective literacy rate of 7+ population was 80.32 per cent.

Religion

Overview
The founder of the Swaminarayan Sampradaya, Swaminarayan was born as Ghanshyam Pandey in the village Chhapaiya of Gonda. As a child, he also lived in Ayodhya and visited the town of Gonda on a pilgrimage with his parents.  The Swaminarayan Akshardham temple in New Delhi is dedicated to him, as Akshardham is his divine abode.

Climate

Transport

By road
Gonda is well connected with the nearby cities Like Balrampur, Faizabad, Basti, Bahraich, Lucknow etc. with the national highways. There are many private and govt. owned roadways buses provide  service to people.

By air
Maryada Purushottam Shri Ram International Airport (Ayodhya) (60km) and Chaudhary Charan Singh International Airport (Lucknow) (132km) are the nearby airports to reach Gonda.

See also
Kakori Conspiracy
Rajendra Nath Lahiri
National Educational Revolutionary Union - NERU (Rashtriya shaikshik krantikari sangh - RSKS)

References

External links 

 Official Web Site Of the District Gonda

 
Cities in Uttar Pradesh
Cities and towns in Gonda district